Herma A was a  Empire F type coaster that was built as Empire Faversham in 1944 by Henry Scarr Ltd, Hessle for the Ministry of War Transport (MoWT). She was sold in 1947 and renamed Fawdon. A further sale in 1952 saw her renamed Maduni. In 1970, she was sold to Trinidad and renamed Herma A. She foundered at Port of Spain in 1975 during a storm.

Description
The ship was an Empire F type coaster built in 1944 by Henry Scarr Ltd, Hessle, United Kingdom.

The ship was propelled by a four-stroke Single Cycle, Single Action diesel engine, which had seven cylinders of 8¾ inches (22 cm) diameter by 11½ inches (30 cm) stroke driving a screw propeller. The engine was built by Mirrlees, Bickerton and Day Ltd, Stockport, Cheshire. It was rated at 42 nhp.

History
The ship was built by Henry Scarr Ltd, Hessle, United Kingdom. She was laid down as CHANT 17 and later renamed Fabric 17 but was launched as Empire Faversham in June 1944 and completed in September 1944. Built for the MOWT, she was placed under the management of R H Hunt Ltd. The United Kingdom Official Number 180292 and Code Letters MLLZ were allocated. Her port of registry was Hull. Little is known of her history during World War II, but her Chief Steward was killed by enemy action on 5 November 1944.

Empire Faversham was sold in 1947 to the Whitehaven Shipping Co Ltd and was renamed Fawdon. She was operated under the management of Anthony & Bainbridge Ltd. In 1952, Fawdon was sold to Booker Brothers, McConnell & Co Ltd, Hull and was renamed Maduni. A new diesel engine was fitted in 1959. In 1970, Maduni was sold to Pedonomou Lines Ltd, Trinidad and was renamed Herma A. She foundered on 19 July 1975 in a storm while moored at Port of Spain, Trinidad.

References

1944 ships
Ships built on the Humber
Empire ships
Ministry of War Transport ships
Merchant ships of the United Kingdom
Merchant ships of Trinidad and Tobago
Maritime incidents in 1975